The Matchmaker (Italian: Paraninfo) is a 1934 Italian comedy film directed by Amleto Palermi and starring Angelo Musco, Rosina Anselmi and Enrica Fantis.

Cast
 Angelo Musco as Don Pasquale Minnedda  
 Rosina Anselmi 
 Enrica Fantis as Signora Minnedda  
 Luisa Garella 
 Carlo Petrangeli 
 Camillo Pilotto as Il direttore della banda 
 Francesco Amodio 
 Alberto Angelini 
 Ada Cannavò 
 Eugenio Colombo 
 Vera Dani 
 María Denis 
 Mariù Gleck 
 Maria Jacobini 
 Amedeo Vecci

References

Bibliography 
 Goble, Alan. The Complete Index to Literary Sources in Film. Walter de Gruyter, 1999.

External links 
 

1934 comedy films
Italian comedy films
1934 films
1930s Italian-language films
Films directed by Amleto Palermi
Italian black-and-white films
1930s Italian films